Afanasyevo is a rural locality (a village) in Vorshinskoye Rural Settlement, Sobinsky District, Vladimir Oblast, Russia. The population was 3 as of 2010.

Geography 
Afanasyevo is located 20 km northeast of Sobinka (the district's administrative centre) by road. Khryastovo is the nearest rural locality.

References 

Rural localities in Sobinsky District
Vladimirsky Uyezd